Chimaphila maculata (spotted wintergreen, also called striped wintergreen, striped prince's pine, spotted pipsissewa, ratsbane, or rheumatism root)  is a small, perennial, evergreen herb native to eastern North America and Central America, from southern Quebec west to Illinois, and south to Florida and Panama.

Description
The variegation of the leaves arises from the distinct white veins contrasted with the dark green of the leaf.

The nearly round flowers, which appear in late July to early August, are found on top of tall stalks. They are white or pinkish and are insect pollinated. The flowers mature to small ( in diameter) capsules bearing the seeds of the plant, which are dispersed by the wind.

Ecology
It can be found in sandy habitats, well-drained upland forests, oak-pine woods, and similar mesic habitats. It is very tolerant of acidic soil.

Medicinal history
"The Creek Indians called it 'pipsisikweu' – which means 'breaks into small pieces' – after the supposed ability to break down gallstones and kidney stones. ... Native Americans used its leaf tea to treat rheumatism and stomach problems, and crushed leaves were applied as a poultice to sores and wounds."

Conservation status
Spotted wintergreen is endangered in Canada, as there are four living populations in southern Ontario, and there is one extremely small extant population in Quebec.

It is endangered in Illinois and Maine. In New York it is considered Exploitably Vulnerable.

See also
Wintergreen (disambiguation)
Wintergreens

References

maculata
Endangered plants
Medicinal plants of Central America
Medicinal plants of North America
Plants described in 1753
Rhizomatous plants
Stoloniferous plants
Taxa named by Carl Linnaeus